The Sengoku period was a time of nearly constant military conflict in Japan from the middle 15th to the early 17th century.

Sengoku may also refer to

Entertainment
 Sengoku (1991 video game), a trilogy of arcade fighting games for the Neo-Geo
 Sengoku (2011 video game), a videogame for Microsoft Windows
 Sengoku (MMA), a mixed-martial arts event organized by World Victory Road
 Sengoku (One Piece), a character in the anime One Piece
 Sengoku (role-playing game), a role-playing game book by Mark Arsenault and Anthony J. Bryant
 Sengoku Ace, an arcade shooting game by Psikyo
 Sengoku Rance, an eroge by Alice Soft

Other uses
 Sengoku (surname), a Japanese surname
 Sengoku clan, a family of daimyō in Edo period Japan
 Sengoku Station, a metro station on the Toei Mita Line in Bunkyo, Tokyo, Japan

See also
 Son Goku (disambiguation)